Michael Barrett (15 January 1927 – 8 July 2006) was an Irish Fianna Fáil politician.

A native of Loughglinn, County Roscommon, who worked in An Foras Taluntais, Barrett was elected to the 22nd Dáil as a Teachta Dála (TD) for the Dublin North-West constituency on his first attempt at the 1981 general election and re-elected until retiring at the 1992 general election.

He was elected to Dublin Corporation in 1979 and also served as chairperson of the Eastern Health Board. He was a traditional catholic and a strong supporter of the anti-abortion movement.

He died in 2006 in Dublin, aged 79.

References

1927 births
2006 deaths
Fianna Fáil TDs
Local councillors in Dublin (city)
Members of the 22nd Dáil
Members of the 23rd Dáil
Members of the 24th Dáil
Members of the 25th Dáil
Members of the 26th Dáil
Politicians from County Roscommon